The Capitol Heights–Minnesota Avenue Line, designated Route V2, V4, is a daily bus route operated by the Washington Metropolitan Area Transit Authority between Capitol Heights station of the Blue and Silver Lines of the Washington Metro and Anacostia station (V2) or Navy Yard–Ballpark station (V4) of the Green Line of the Washington Metro. The line runs every 12 minutes daily and 30 minutes at all other times. Trips take roughly 45-50 minutes.

Background
Routes V2 and V4 provide service between Capitol Heights station and Anacostia station or Navy Yard–Ballpark station. These routes connect Northeast residents to Southeast from Benning Heights. Routes V2 and V4 operate out of Southern Avenue division on weekdays, Andrews Federal Center on select trips, and Shepherd Parkway on weekends.

History
Routes V2 originally operated by the Washington Railway & Electric Company under the Capitol Heights–Anacostia Line running between Capitol Heights and Anacostia. Route V4 also operated under the Washington Railway & Electric Company under the Capitol Heights-Navy Yard Line between Capitol Heights and Navy Yard. Both lines would later be acquired by Capital Traction Company and were converted into buses on May 1, 1949. Both lines were later acquired by WMATA on February 4, 1973. 

V2 had a prior incarnation as the 4th Street Line under the Washington Railway & Electric Company but was later replaced by the M2. V4 also had a prior incarnation as the S. Washington-Ridge Rd. under the Capital Traction Company but was later consolidated.

V6 was discontinued and replaced by the V4 on January 22, 1984.

Route V4 originally operated until the 1990s when they were replaced by the Minnesota Ave-M St Line on December 28, 1991.

Route U2
Route U2 originally operated as the Benning-Kenilworth Line under the Washington Railway & Electric Company before being renamed into the V8.

Route U2 originally operated into Maryland but was discontinued on December 3, 1978 and replaced by routes F14 and P12. Route U2 would operate as the Deanwood–Minnesota Avenue Line between the Deanwood station & Benning Heights (Hanna Place SE & Benning Road SE), via the Minnesota Avenue Metro Station, and then via Minnesota Avenue NE, Eastern Avenue NE, Kenilworth Avenue NE, Deane Avenue NE, Minnesota Avenue NE/SE, Ridge Road SE, Anacostia Road SE, B Street SE, Texas Avenue SE, E Street SE, Alabama Avenue SE, H Street SE, Benning Road SE, Hanna Place SE, and H Street SE.

Changes
On December 28, 1991, when Anacostia station opened, U2 was rerouted to operate between the Minnesota Avenue station and Anacostia station via Minnesota Avenue NE/SE, Good Hope Road SE, 16th Street SE (to the Minnesota Avenue), W Street SE (Minnesota Avenue), Martin Luther King Jr. Avenue SE, and Howard Road SE, instead of operating between Deanwood station & Benning Heights.

Route U2's routing between the Deanwood and Minnesota Avenue stations, was replaced by the brand new Minnesota Avenue–M Street Line, or V7, V8, and V9. U2's routing between the intersection of Anacostia Road SE & Minnesota Avenue SE and Hanna Place SE & Benning Road SE, via Minnesota Avenue SE, Ridge Road SE, Anacostia Road SE, B Street SE, Texas Avenue SE, E Street SE, Alabama Avenue SE, H Street SE, Benning Road SE, Hanna Place SE, and H Street SE to its Benning Heights terminus at the intersection of Hanna Place SE & Benning Road SE, was replaced by route V9.

On December 18, 2011, new Saturday service was added to the U2 running every 30 minutes between 6:45 AM to 9:45 PM.

2014 Study
During WMATA's Fiscal Year of 2015, they announced a series of proposals of simplification affecting the current routes U2, U4, U5, U6, U8, V7, V8, and V9. 

At the time of the proposals, the routes were suffering from on-time performances, and several bus bunching on the routes. Route U2 will have daily service at all times between Capitol Heights station and Anacostia station via the current U8 route between Capitol Heights station and Minnesota Avenue station via Nannie Helen Burroughs Avenue, then via the current U2 route to Anacostia station.

 Route U2 will have daily service at all times between Capitol Heights station and Anacostia station via the current U8 route between Capitol Heights station and Minnesota Avenue station via Nannie Helen Burroughs Avenue, then via the current U2 route to Anacostia station.
 Routes V7, V8: Daily service at all times between Capitol Heights station and Navy Yard–Ballpark station via the current U8 route between Capitol Heights station and Minnesota Avenue station, then via the current V7 route to Navy Yard Ballpark station. 
 Route V9: Peak period service between Benning Heights and Bureau of Engraving via the current V9 route between Benning Heights and Navy Yard Ballpark station, then via the current V7 route to Bureau of Engraving.
 Service between Minnesota Avenue station and Deanwood station will be replaced by an extended route U4.
 U8 service between Minnesota Avenue and Capitol Heights will be replaced by route U2.

The reason for the changes was in order to enhance connectivity between points of regional demand, create a better balance of capacity and demand lines serving the Minnesota Avenue, and to reduce/eliminate service with low productivity on the line. According to WMATA, there will be approximately 700 of 5,300 weekday passenger trips (13%), 750 of 3,200 Saturday passenger trips (23%) and 600 of 2,900 Sunday passenger trips (21%) that will be affected by shortening routes V7 and V8 at Navy Yard Station if the changes occur. Weekday passengers affected may be less due to the proposed extension of route V9.

Modified Route
On June 21, 2015, route U2 and renamed route V2 and was extended to Capitol Heights station via Nannie Helen Burroughs Avenue and follow U2's routing between Minnesota Avenue station and Anacostia station. Routes V7 and V8 were renamed route V4 which was shorten to Navy Yard–Ballpark station with service between Navy Yard and the Bureau of Engraving being replaced by route V9 which was renamed route V1. The new line will be called the Capitol Heights–Minnesota Avenue Line. Route V2 will operate Monday through Saturday with no Sunday service (the same pattern as the U2), and route V4 will operate daily (the same pattern as routes V7 and V8).
 
In the process of the changes, route U2, V7, V8, and V9 designation were discontinued, and route U8 was shorten to operate between Minnesota Avenue station and Benning Heights.

During the COVID-19 pandemic, Route V2 and V4 was reduced to operate on its Saturday supplemental schedule during the weekdays beginning on March 16, 2020. On March 18, 2020, the line was further reduced to operate on its Sunday schedule with Route V2 being suspended. Weekend service for V4 was later reduced to every 30 minutes on March 21, 2020. The pre-pandemic schedule and V2 service was restored on August 23, 2020.

In February 2021 during the FY2022 budget, WMATA proposed to eliminate the V4 and give the V2 daily service to replace it if WMATA does not get federal funding.

On June 6, 2021, late night service was added to route V2 daily, adding Sunday Service on route V2 for the first time, while route V4 was shortened late nights to 11:30 pm weekdays and 10:30 pm weekends.

On September 5, 2021, Both Routes were increased to every 24 minutes with a combined 12 minutes between Capitol Heights station and Minnesota and Pennsylvania Avenues SE from 7AM - 9PM, with the V2 also getting full Sunday service.

Incidents
 On September 18, 2016, a V4 bus collided with a van along Minnesota Avenue and Hayes Street injuring 20 people.

References

2015 establishments in Washington, D.C.
V2